Rat is an unincorporated community in northeast Shannon County, in the U.S. state of Missouri. The community is adjacent to Big Creek, approximately six miles south-southwest of Bunker.

History
A post office called Rat was established in 1898, and remained in operation until it was discontinued in 1954. The community was named "Rat" in protest after postal authorities denied the townspeople their first choice of "Buckshorn". Rat has been noted for its unusual place name.

References

Unincorporated communities in Shannon County, Missouri
Unincorporated communities in Missouri